Matt Palmer may refer to:

 Matt Palmer (baseball) (born 1979), American baseball pitcher
 Matthew Palmer (diplomat), American diplomat
 Matt Palmer (director), director of the 2018 film Calibre
 Matt Palmer (footballer) (born 1995), English footballer for Swindon Town
 Matt Palmer (racing driver), Australian racing driver
 Matthew Palmer (born 1964), New Zealand judge, legal academic and public servant
 Matthew Palmer (footballer), New Zealand footballer